Shavington Academy (formerly Shavington High School) is a coeducational secondary school, located in Rope Lane, Shavington, Cheshire East, England. It is adjacent to the Shavington Leisure Centre.

Previously a foundation school administered by Cheshire East Council, Shavington High School converted to academy status in September 2015 and was renamed Shavington Academy. However the school continues to coordinate with Cheshire East Council for admissions.

Notable former pupils
Ashley Shaw (born 1991), cricketer
Greg Steele (born 1991), Basketball International

References

External links
 School Website

Secondary schools in the Borough of Cheshire East
Academies in the Borough of Cheshire East